Sandro Wolfinger (born 24 August 1991) is a Liechtensteiner footballer who currently plays for FC Balzers.

International career
He is a member of the Liechtenstein national football team and holds 53 caps and has scored two goals, making his debut in a friendly against Estonia on 19 November 2013.

International goals
Score and Result lists Liechtenstein's goal tally first

|-
| 1. || 28 March 2016 || Centro Deportivo Municipal de Marbella, Marbella, Spain ||  || align=center |2–3 || align=center |2–3 || Friendly ||
|-
| 2. || 6 September 2018 || Vazgen Sargsyan Republican Stadium, Yerevan, Armenia ||  || align=center |1–1 || align=center |1–2 || 2018–19 UEFA Nations League ||

Personal life
Sandro is the middle of three Wolfinger brothers to have been capped by the Liechtenstein senior team after Marco and Fabio.

References

1991 births
Living people
Liechtenstein footballers
Liechtenstein international footballers
FC Ruggell players
Association football midfielders
Liechtenstein expatriate footballers
Expatriate footballers in Germany
Liechtenstein expatriate sportspeople in Germany
SV Heimstetten players